Julius Blüthner Pianofortefabrik GmbH, is a piano-manufacturing company in Leipzig, Germany. 

Along with C. Bechstein, Bösendorfer and Steinway & Sons, Blüthner is frequently referred to as one of the "Big Four" piano manufacturers.

History 
 
Julius Blüthner established his workshop in Leipzig, Saxony in 1853. This accomplishment was only achieved after a long and difficult campaign to gain Leipzig citizenship. Julius started his endeavor with himself and three other craftsman. A deeply religious man, Julius spoke the defining words that would allow his company to survive and flourish for the next 162 years, "May God Prevail". The age of any particular Blüthner piano can be determined by matching its serial number to the age table freely available on the Blüthner website.

By 1900 Blüthner had become the largest piano maker in Germany, producing some 5,000 instruments annually. Innovations such as the Aliquot string, a fourth string that vibrated sympathetically and that is tuned in unison as well as the cylindrical soundboard and angle cut hammers, created a unique voice for the Blüthner instrument.

The owners Adolf Max Blüthner, Dr. Paul Robert and Willy Bruno Heinrich were awarded an imperial and royal warrant of appointment to the court of Austria-Hungary.

In 1936, Blüthner was selected to build the piano for the airship Hindenburg.

During World War II Blüthner factory was destroyed in an air raid in 1942.

After the war, Dr. Rudolf Blüthner-Haessler rebuilt the company and in 1948 the production of pianos was finally resumed.

In 1972, the company was nationalized by the East German government but because of Ingbert Blüthner-Haessler remaining as a managing director in the company, the company was able to remain economically viable.

With the Fall of the Berlin Wall in 1989 and German reunification in 1990, the Blüthner family was finally able to regain control of the company. Ingbert Blüthner-Haessler reorganized the company by increasing the production capacity and modernizing the manufacturing process.

From 1994 to 1997 a new factory was built in Störmthal near Leipzig.

Since 1995 Ingbert Blüthner-Haessler shared the management of the company with his two sons, Dr. Christian Blüthner-Haessler and Knut Blüthner-Haessler.

In 2009, the piano company Karl Rönisch merged with Blüthner and Karl Rönisch production was moved to Blüthner factory in Leipzig.

Today, along with C. Bechstein, Bösendorfer and Steinway & Sons, Blüthner is frequently referred to as one of the "Big Four" piano manufacturers.

Current grand piano models

Current upright piano models

Discontinued piano models 
List of discontinued piano models:

Designer models 
The one-of-a-kind Blüthner piano of particular interest was a special lightweight instrument, made for use on the Zeppelin LZ 129 Hindenburg. The piano had its harp plate made of aluminum, that saved about 100 kg of weight versus a regular cast iron plate of the same size piano. This was the first piano used in flight, and it was used in an "air-concert" radio broadcast. It was removed in 1937 to save weight so it survived the Hindenburg'''s infamous crash, only to be destroyed by bombing during WWII. A replica of this piano was featured in the 1975 film The Hindenburg where Reed Channing (Peter Donat) sings. Since the film is set during the airship's final flight, during which the piano was not on the ship, the piano's presence is a historical error.

Blüthner makes a few specialized pianos including some with the design reversed so that a left-handed person can play the tenor with his left hand and the bass with his right hand. In 2008 they designed and built a special keyboard for a customer in Spain which had the Jankó keyboard design.

 Brands 
In addition to the Blüthner brand, Blüthner manufactures two other brands: Haessler for the mid-level market and Irmler for the entry-level market.

 Haessler 
Made for the mid-level piano market, Haessler pianos are designed and built in the same factory as Bluthner pianos.

 Irmler 
Made for the entry-level piano market, Irmler pianos are designed by Blüthner and manufactured in different countries. The Studio Edition pianos are manufactured in China and shipped to Germany were they receive Abel hammers. Professional Edition pianos use structural and acoustical elements from the Samick factory in Indonesia and cabinets from Poland and then are assembled in Germany.

 Notable Blüthner artists 

Numerous royals, composers, conductors, artists, authors and performers have owned Blüthner pianos. They include Willhelm II, Emperor Franz Joseph I, Johannes Brahms, Gustav Mahler, Liberace, Béla Bartók, Claude Debussy, George Formby, Dodie Smith, Max Reger, Richard Wagner, Johann Strauss, Pyotr Ilyich Tchaikovsky, Dmitri Shostakovich, Petronel Malan. 
Sergei Rachmaninoff commented that "There are only two things which I took with me on my way to America...my wife and my precious Blüthner".

Blüthners have been used in popular music, as well. One Blüthner piano owned by the Abbey Road Studios in London was used on some tracks of The Beatles' Let It Be (1970) album, most notably, in the hits "Let It Be" and "The Long and Winding Road". Blüthners were also used in the films Gaslight (1944) and The Sting (1973), and one was played by Hannibal Lecter in the movie Hannibal. Another, a stunt piano, was destroyed in Iron Man (2008). A Blüthner piano also appears in the 2004 Cole Porter biopic De-Lovely'' in the Venice apartment scenes.

References

External links 

Manufacturing companies based in Leipzig
Piano manufacturing companies of Germany
Purveyors to the Imperial and Royal Court
Saxon Royal Warrant holders
1853 establishments in Saxony
German companies established in 1853
German brands
Manufacturing companies established in 1853
Music in Leipzig